British news websites
The Manc is a British social media publisher and news and entertainment company with a focus on the region of Greater Manchester after which the brand is named (the idea of Manc or having a Manchester dialect); and where it is located. The Manc was founded by Sam Ridgway who also acts as the publisher's Editor-in-Chief.

History
In 2014 The Manc began by posting nostalgic pictures of Manchester on Facebook. Soon, the founder, Ridgway, was hired by UNILAD as their first employee. Ridgway kept his page alive during his tenure at UNILAD, but in October 2018 the firm went into administration and were acquired by LADbible – at which point Ridgway left the organisation to focus on The Manc's future.

Following a pivot towards news and away from a strategy of only photographs and pictures, in 2019, The Manc became the North West's largest social news platform online.

In July 2020, as the COVID-19 pandemic lockdown began to lift across the UK for the hospitality sector, Ridgway and his team put the backing of The Manc's large following forward for a social cause.

References

External links 
 themanc.com